Nitrapyrin is an organic compound with the formula ClC5H3NCCl3, and is described as a white crystalline solid with a sweet odor.It is used as a nitrification inhibitor and bactericide, which is applied to soils for the growing of agricultural crops since 1974. Nitrapyrin was put up for review by the EPA and deemed safe for use in 2005. Nitrapyrin is an effective nitrification inhibitor to the bacteria Nitrosomonas and has been shown to drastically the reduce the amount of N2O emissions from the soil.

Synthesis
Nitrapyrin is commonly produced by the photochlorination of 2-methylpyridine:
CH3-C5H4N  +  4Cl2   →  CCl3-ClC5H3N + 4 HCl

Function
Nitrapyrin affects the ammonia monooxygenase (AMO) pathway, which is important for NH3 oxidation in nitrification; it also functions as an inhibitor of the urease enzyme in the nitrifying bacteria Nitrosomonas, preventing hydrolytic action on urea.  It is applied to the region of soil and inhibits nitrification for 8–10 weeks. Urease Inhibition specifically prevents the following reaction:

(NH2)2CO + H2O → CO2 + 2NH3

Without this capability Nitrosomonas cannot produce nitrite thus inhibiting nitrification:

2NH4+ + 3O2 → 2NO2− + 2 H2O + 4H+

Degradation/Decomposition
Nitrapyrin decomposes both in soil and in plants.  The compound itself tends not to persist in nature. The primary decomposition is the hydrolysis of the trichloromethyl functional group, resulting primarily in 6-chloro-picolinic acid which is the only detected residue in plant metabolisms.

Effects in Agriculture 
In an agricultural setting, nitrapyrin is seen to increase nitrogen retention and decrease nitrogen leaching in root zone. Nitrapyrin also has the effect of increasing crop yield and decreasing emissions of N2O gas.Nitrapyrin isn't the only product applied to soils for the growing of crops, when combined with urea and mulch, wheat biomass increased by 33% and overall yield increased by 23%. Total N2O emissions reduced by 66-75% when compared to urea only experiments, suggesting that nitrapyrin affects the ability of ammonia-oxidizing bacteria to engage in nitrification and produce N2O gas.

References

Chloropyridines
Trichloromethyl compounds
Sweet-smelling chemicals